The Generation 4 car was the NASCAR vehicle generation used from 1992 to 2007 full-time in the NASCAR Cup Series, in the Busch/Nationwide Series until 2010, and in the ARCA Racing Series until 2017.  The generation has been described as the generation that removed all "stock" aspects from stock car racing and as aerodynamically sensitive as a Le Mans Prototype.

Generation 4 cars feature highly modified bodies with teams to spending hours in the wind tunnel to gain aerodynamics.  The bumpers, nose and tail composed of molded fiberglass based on production counterparts.

History 
In 1992, the Gen 4 car arrived at the sport when steel bodies became primarily custom made instead of using stock pieces, and wind tunnels became a staple as teams worked to gain aerodynamics. At racing speeds approaching 200 miles per hour, a modern NASCAR race car can generate enough lift to get airborne if it spins sideways. To keep cars firmly planted, roof flaps were required in 1994.

1994 was also the final year that V6 engines were used in the Busch Series, as many short track series had abandoned six-cylinder engines.

In 1995, Chevrolet switched back to the Monte Carlo, which started the trend of rounder body shapes in Cup and the then-Busch Series. In 1998, Ford introduced the Taurus, which was the first four-door stock car model approved for NASCAR competition in the modern era.

In 2001, Dodge made its return to NASCAR with the Intrepid. That same year, Dale Earnhardt died from a crash at the Daytona 500, leading NASCAR to make serious safety changes. In 2003, in response to the asymmetrical body of the Taurus in the previous seasons, NASCAR set up new body rules, better known as the "common body templates" rule; as a result, the hood, roof, and decklid were no longer required to be identical to their stock counterparts. In 2004, the sport switched from Unocal 76 fuel to Sunoco.

The Gen 4 car was used full time until 2007, and it was retired in the Cup Series after the 2007 season (in which Toyota, who had already competed in the NASCAR Craftsman Truck Series, made their debut in the Cup and the then-Busch Series with the Camry), while the other sixteen races were run by the fifth-generation Car of Tomorrow. The Car of Tomorrow went full-time in 2008, with the second-tier series adopting their own Car of Tomorrow first part-time in 2010 and full-time the following year. Body panels in the style of the Gen 4 car continue to be manufactured by Five Star Race Car Bodies, and were legal in the ARCA Racing Series until 2020, when composite-bodied cars in the style of the Generation 6 were mandated (despite this, modern ARCA cars still use Gen 4 chassis). As of 2022, the Gen 4 car is still legal in the ARCA Menards Series West and East (though Dodge body panels are illegal); Hailie Deegan scored her first NASCAR win at the Las Vegas Motor Speedway dirt track in a Gen 4 Toyota Camry in 2019.

In the generation's final years, aerodynamic development led to some of the cars (otherwise known as "offset" bodies) being called "twisted sisters" in reference to the asymmetrical shapes of the car's body. The Car of Tomorrow, by contrast, featured a symmetrical body in order to curb aerodynamic development wars in an attempt to cut costs.

Models

Chrysler
 Dodge Intrepid (2001–2004, no model branding in 2004)
 Dodge Charger (2005–2007, use continued until 2010 in Nationwide Series)

Ford
 Ford Thunderbird (1992–1999, limited superspeedway use after 1997)
 Ford Taurus (1998–2005)
 Ford Fusion (2006–2007, use continued until 2010 in Nationwide Series)

General Motors
 Chevrolet Lumina (1992-1994)
 Chevrolet Monte Carlo (1995–2005)
 Chevrolet Monte Carlo SS (2006–2007, use continued until 2008 in Nationwide Series)
 Chevrolet Impala (2009-2010, Nationwide Series only)
 Pontiac Grand Prix (1992–2004, no factory support after 2003, use continued until 2005 in Busch Series, and until 2007 in the ARCA Racing Series)

Toyota
 Toyota Camry (2007, use continued until 2010 in Nationwide Series)

See also 
 Cup Series cars

References

External links 

NASCAR Cup Series
1990s in NASCAR
2000s in NASCAR
Vehicles introduced in 1992
2007 endings